Delocated (or known in the title card as Delocated New York) is an American television series that premiered February 12, 2009 on Adult Swim. The original pilot for the show was aired on April 1, 2008. Jon Glaser plays a man in the Witness Protection Program who moves his family to New York City. The family exploits the situation by starring in a reality TV show about being in the Witness Protection Program (in which, initially, they all wear disguises for their faces and voices; later, only "Jon" does). Eugene Mirman co-stars in all seasons as Yvgeny, a Russian mafia associate and aspiring stand-up comic hired to kill "Jon."

This series is produced by Wonder Showzen and Xavier: Renegade Angel creators and rock band PFFR. It leans decidedly towards deadpan humor while still reflecting the black humor typical of their other shows. It is presented as if it were the fictional reality show which it portrays.

In the first seven episodes, Delocated had an eleven-minute runtime; as of season two, each episode had a twenty-two-minute runtime. The series finale aired as a special, Delocated: The Frrt Identity, on March 7, 2013.

Plot
After testifying as a witness against a Russian mob family, "Jon" and his family are uprooted and start living undercover through the witness protection program. After existing quietly in an anonymous suburb, "Jon" accepts an offer for the family to participate in a reality show based on their current lives. In order to protect their identities from viewers—which could include the Russian gangsters who want him killed for testifying against them—they wear ski masks and have their voices digitally disguised. As part of the deal, the family is relocated to an upscale loft in New York City, where the series will be filmed. Not only does "Jon" find out that the "sweet" loft was not as advertised, his wife "Susan" promptly concludes that the life of a ski-masked, voice-disguised reality TV star is the wrong environment for her and their teenage son "David." Picked up for a second season by the network, "Jon" has little time to celebrate as the vicious Mirminsky family renews its efforts to destroy him and everything he holds dear.

Cast and characters

 "Jon" (Jon Glaser) – The star of the documentary-within-a-reality-show, and a former architect. To prevent the Mirminskis from identifying him from by watching his reality show, he always wears a ski mask to disguise his face, and uses a vocal pitch shifter to disguise his voice. Jon is arrogant, delusional, ignorant, inconsiderate of all others, and engages in erratic behavior and schemes that frequently put himself and his family's witness protection status at risk. However, he also occasionally displays acts of incredible kindness and decency, albeit usually in vain. He is an ardent fan of submarine sandwiches.
 "Susan" (Nadia Dajani) – Jon's ex-wife, and mother of Jon's son, David. Starved for attention after years of having her needs neglected in her former marriage, she habitually starts romantic/sexual relationships with each subsequent federal agent assigned to protect her and David.
 "David" (Jacob Kogan) – "Jon" and Susan's first and only son. He is usually aggravated by his father's stupidity and lack of parenting skills. After he and Susan remove their Witness Protection disguises, he occasionally struggles to adopt a life he can identify with.
 Yvgeny Mirminsky (Eugene Mirman) – An incompetent Russian hit man and stand-up comedian who has been ordered to kill "Jon." His stand-up comedy act consists only of jokes about vodka. Despite this, he actually enjoys a fair amount of recognition from his fan base.
 Sergei Mirminsky (Steve Cirbus) – The ill-tempered and menacing older brother of Yvgeny. After tiring of Yvgeny's repeated failures, the Mirminsky family brings in Sergei to murder Jon. Unlike the overweight and incompetent Yvgeny, the muscle-bound Sergei is an efficient, sadistic, and ruthless assassin. He spends his time trying to slowly kill Jon's "soul" first before literally killing him.
 Mike the Federal Agent (Kevin Dorff) – Jon's original bodyguard and best friend.
 Rob the New Federal Agent (Mather Zickel) – Jon's second FBI bodyguard and Susan's ex-boyfriend.
 TB the Newest Federal Agent (Ali Farahnakian) – Jon's third bodyguard. He is a war veteran and some sort of unspecified ex-military mercenary. He is always seen wearing hunting glasses and a Kevlar bulletproof vest. Unlike Jon's previous bodyguards, TB shows little emotion and is very serious about his job, generally affirming Jon's statements and ideas.
 Qi-qang (Yung-I Chang) – The head of the Wang Cho Chinese mob that Jon eventually hires for protection. He is Jon's main contact with the group, and is clearly scamming Jon out of millions of dollars. The Wang Cho's all find Jon very annoying, but continue to put up with him because of all the money he blindly gives them.
The Glaze (Marc Wootton) – Jon's personal guru/therapist, brought in season 3 to help Jon deal with the death of his ex-wife. He often attempts to advertise himself to the network.
 Kim (Zoe Lister-Jones) – An aspiring artist who became Jon's girlfriend after his divorce.
 Susan Shapiro (Janeane Garofalo) – The president of the network who takes over the production duties of the show. Jon constantly hits on her in hopes she will date him.
 Mighty Joe Jon: The Black Blond (Jerry Minor) – The executive producer of Delocated during the second season. He also executive produces Yvgeny Mirminsky's reality show. A running joke is that he is repeatedly referred to by his full nickname, even by the FBI and Russian mafia.
 Seth Goldstein (David Beach) – The executive producer of Delocated during the first season. In an attempt to get more hype for the show, he also films Yvgeny's side of the story and eventually gives him a spin-off, even as he clearly tries to kill Jon.
 Jay (Larry Murphy) The doorman to Jon's building who always wears a fake mustache. Jon is impulsively annoyed by him and constantly tells him to shut up and leave, despite how repeatedly kind and supportive Jay is to Jon's efforts.
 Ryan (Eli Newell) – Kim's brother who hates Jon.
 Rick (Brian Kiley) – Jon's boss at the copy shop during the first season.
 Todd Barry (Todd Barry) – Playing a fictionalized version of himself, he is a stand-up comedian who is often seen casually playing poker with the Mirminsky crime family at the Russian Social Club, despite the fact that Sergei can't stand him.
 Gregor Mirminsky (Vladimir Bibic) – The imprisoned head of the Mirminsky family, as well as Yvgeny's biological father and Sergei's adoptive father. He is constantly disappointed by Yvgeny's failings and decisions, which is the only thing motivating Yvgeny to try and kill Jon.
 Pavel (Glenn Fleshler) – Member of the Mirminsky family and the cousin of Sergei and Yvgeny.
 Greg DiPietro (Julian Gamble) – FBI agent assigned to investigating the Mirminsky's threats to Jon, who is a very realistic and serious man frustrated by Jon's antics and influence.
 Bryce Grieke (Andrew Daly) – Jon's lawyer. He reluctantly puts up with Jon, despite the idiotic nature of many of the legal assignments Jon has him working on.
Pete Fontaine (Kurt Braunohler) – The warm-up comedian for many of the network's shows, including their hit sitcom Attitude Stool. Jon hires him to "warm-up" his life, in hopes to get Susan Shapiro in a better mood whenever he visits her.
 Trish (Amy Schumer) – Yvgeny's girlfriend in season 3, who lives for drama.
 Mishka (also played by Jon Glaser) – A member of the Mirminsky's Russian mob, hired by Yvgeny to pose as Jon.
 Eun Mi (Sue Jean Kim) – Jon's girlfriend during the third season. She constantly points out Jon's faults while challenging him to be "exciting".

Episodes

International broadcast 
In Canada, Delocated previously aired on G4's Adult Digital Distraction block, and currently airs on the Canadian version of Adult Swim.

Home media
The first two seasons were released on DVD in the United States on January 17, 2012. In Australia Madman Entertainment has plans to release the DVD as well according to a DVD sampler.

References

External links

Interview with Jon Glaser

2008 American television series debuts
2013 American television series endings
2000s American mockumentary television series
2010s American mockumentary television series
Television series by PFFR
Adult Swim original programming
English-language television shows
Television shows set in New York City
Triad (organized crime)
Television series about witness protection
Works about the Russian Mafia
Television series by Williams Street